Benjamin W. Alpiner (November 13, 1867 – July 15, 1946) was an American businessman and politician.

Alpiner was born in Chicago, Illinois. He lived in Kankakee, Illinois and was involved in the cigar manufacturing and banking businesses in Kankakee; Alpiner was the owner of the S. Alpiner & Son tobacco shop in Kankakee. Alpiner served as Kankakee City Clerk. He also served as mayor of Kankakee from 1911 to 1913, from 1915 to 1917, and from 1923 to 1925. Alpiner was a Democrat. Alpiner then served in the Illinois House of Representatives from 1933 until his death in 1946. He died at his home in Kankakee, Illinois from a stroke and after being ill for several months.

Notes

External links

1867 births
1946 deaths
Politicians from Chicago
People from Kankakee, Illinois
Businesspeople from Illinois
Mayors of places in Illinois
Democratic Party members of the Illinois House of Representatives